The Siket Disc is the eighth studio album by the American rock band Phish. The album was released in June 1999 through the band's website and mail-order service, and was released commercially by Elektra Records on November 7, 2000. Unlike Phish's other records, The Siket Disc is completely instrumental, and its songs are excerpts from studio jams recorded during the sessions for The Story of the Ghost.

Production
The Siket Disc emerged from material developed during the Bearsville Studio sessions for Phish's 1998 album The Story of the Ghost. Not exactly outtakes or unfinished songs, The Siket Discs compositions are actually select excerpts from the long-form improvisation of the "Ghost Sessions". Phish keyboard player Page McConnell edited and mastered the selections into this compilation, named for engineer John Siket.

The material on The Siket Disc is defined by an almost ambient, post-rock sound that is a distinct departure from the band's major studio albums. The album is almost completely instrumental, but contains a few instances of vocalization. "Quadrophonic Toppling", for instance, includes a triggered sample of bass guitarist Mike Gordon repeating the song's title.

Only the compositions "My Left Toe" and "What's the Use?" have been notably incorporated into the band's live shows on a somewhat regular basis. (However, "Quadrophonic Toppling" and "The Happy Whip and Dung Song" have each made at least one live appearance).

Gordon has indicated that The Siket Disc became a fixture in the band's late night tour bus music rotation in the early 2000s, saying that "It fit the vibe perfectly ... It's one of the only instances I can remember when we regularly played our own music."

In February 2009, this album was made available as a download in FLAC and MP3 formats at LivePhish.com.

Track listing

PersonnelPhish'
Trey Anastasio – guitars
Page McConnell – keyboards
Mike Gordon – bass guitar
Jon Fishman – drums

with
John Siket – engineer

References

External links
Phish's official website
Phish: Official Releases – The Siket Disc

2000 albums
Phish albums
LivePhish.com Downloads
Elektra Records albums
Instrumental rock albums